The Retail Council of Canada, founded in 1963, is a not-for-profit trade association representing retail companies in Canada. RCC coordinates advocacy, communications and education campaigns on behalf of its member companies.

It manages the voluntary retail Scanner Price Accuracy Code.

References

External links

Trade associations based in Canada
1963 establishments in Ontario
Organizations established in 1963
Retail trade associations
Non-profit organizations based in Toronto
Retailing in Canada